is a former Japanese football player.

Playing career
Shiotani was born in Osaka Prefecture on May 11, 1970. After graduating from Kindai University, he joined Otsuka Pharmaceutical in 1993. He played many matches as left side back and left side midfielder. In 1996, he moved to newly was promoted to J1 League club, Kyoto Purple Sanga. In 1999, he moved to his local club Gamba Osaka. Although he played in first 2 matches, he got hurt in 2nd match and could hardly play in the match after that. He retired end of 1999 season.

Club statistics

References

External links

kyotosangadc

1970 births
Living people
Kindai University alumni
Association football people from Osaka Prefecture
Japanese footballers
J1 League players
Japan Football League (1992–1998) players
Tokushima Vortis players
Kyoto Sanga FC players
Gamba Osaka players
Japanese men's futsal players
Association football defenders